Staraoke is a children's game show (from 8 to 12 years old) based on karaoke, which aired on Boomerang in Europe. The show was created in Finland by the company Intervisio and was broadcast on MTV3 from 2003 to 2011.

The show's format began to be sold in Europe in 2006; the first two countries to create their own Staraoke version were Hungary and Sweden, which were aired on Minimax and MTV respectively. In 2007, Intervisio won an International Interactive Emmy Award for "Best Interactive Programming" thanks to Staraoke.

Staraoke in Europe

References

Singing talent shows
International Cartoon Network original programming